Maxillaria praetexta is a species of orchid endemic to Venezuela (Carabobo).

References

External links 

praetexta
Endemic orchids of Venezuela
Flora of Carabobo